Epistolae Ho-Elianae (or Familiar Letters) is a literary work by the 17th-century Anglo-Welsh historian and writer, James Howell. It was mainly written when Howell was in the Fleet Prison, during the 1640s; but its content reflects earlier travels he made from 1616 on behalf of a London glass factory. It appeared in three volumes from 1645 to 1650. A fourth volume was added in a collected edition of 1655.

It has been suggested that some of the letters are fictional. The selection of the recipients has also been attributed to patronage relationships. A "Mrs. A. W." who occurs as recipient has been fitted to another letter by Howell to provide a tentative deductive identification of the author of A Continuation of Sir Philip Sydney's Arcadia (1651) as Anna Weamys, who is not otherwise traced as a writer.

As travel literature, Howell's work largely neglects scenic description. But some of the language used has been described as a possible source for the work of Joshua Poole on epithets.

The fourth edition (1678) was published by Thomas Guy, and profits went to founding Guy's Hospital in London.

Notes

External links

Anglo-Welsh literature
1645 books